Hu Songshan (1880–1955), a Hui, was born in 1880, in Tongxin County, Ningxia, China. His Muslim name in Arabic was Sa'd al-Din. Although he was born Sufi and turned Wahhabi, he changed his views and turned his back on Wahhabism after a Hajj to Mecca and later became an important imam, scripturalist, and leader of the Yihewani Muslim sect in China. He was influential and played an important role in Chinese Islam in this position as he propagated reformist doctrines in Ningxia in his later life. Hu also played a role in rallying Muslims against the Japanese invasion of China.

Early life and education
Hu's father was a Gansu ahong (imam) belonging to the Khafiya menhuan, a Chinese-style Naqshbandi Sufi order. When Hu Songshan was 18, he joined Wang Naibi of Haicheng. At age 21, he became imam of the anti-Sufi Yihewani (Ikhwan in Arabic) sect, which was founded by the Wahhabi Ma Wanfu. Hu opposed wasteful rituals and cash payments for religious services, which Sufi orders practiced. Being a member of the Yihewani, he was so against Sufism and the menhuan to the point where he destroyed his own father's gongbei (a Hui Islamic shrine centered around a Sufi master's grave) built at Tongxin.

Life
He went on Hajj to Mecca in 1924 at age 45, traveling through Shanghai and he reached Mecca in 1925. When Hu was in Mecca, he did not feel solidarity with other Muslims, he was treated racistly on hajj because he was from China, so he became a Chinese nationalist working to build a strong China, and abandoned salafism. Instead of advocating an Islamic state, he wanted Muslims to practice their religion in a strong China. He saw that Hui and Han people were treated the same and abused by foreigners. He rallied against foreign Imperialism and preached Chinese nationalism and unity between all Chinese. In Wuzhong County, Ningxia, Hu was the principal of an Arabic school. Hu Songshan had changed from being a Wahhabi Salafi to a modernist and influenced the Yihewani to change its ideology along that trend. One of his followers was Muhammad Ma Jian. Another one of his followers was the Yihewani Imam Ma Fulong (d. 1970). Hu became a prominent reformist and modernist Imam and Muhammad Ma Jian studied alongside him in 1928.

Hu encouraged unity and cooperation both between Muslims in China, and between non-Muslims and Muslims in China too, using Chinese classics to advance Chinese nationalism. He studied modern science, promoted sports for his students, and permitted people to take pictures of his mosque and him, which made him stand out from less-liberal Yihewani. Hu promoted reform of traditional Islamic education as his views while a follower of the Yihewani changed.

Hu Songshan and the Hui Muslim warlord of Ningxia, General Ma Hongkui cooperated in founding several Sino-Arabic schools (中阿學校) in Ningxia to promote Chinese and Arabic language Islamic education for Chinese Muslims in the 1930s and 1940s. Hu Songshan became head of the Ningxia Private Sino- Arabic College at Dongdasi Mosque, which was founded by Ma Hongkui in Yinchuan, the capital of Ningxia province 1932. Students flocked to it from province across China after it became a public institution in the following year. Ten days prior to Ramadan's end in 1935, Ma Hongkui arranged for Chinese New Year celebrations. Hu Songshan pronounced kufr upon Ma Hongkui for this, while delivering an aggressive and fierce sermon in public. Ma Hongkui then sacked Hu from his position and exiled him. Hu then received clemency from Ma and was sent to head the Sino-Arabic Normal School in Wuzhong in 1938.

When Japan invaded China in 1937 during the Second Sino Japanese War, Hu Songshan ordered that the Chinese Flag be saluted during morning prayer, . A prayer was written by him in Arabic and Chinese which prayed for the defeat of the Japanese and support of the Chinese government. The Quran was used to justify struggling against the Japanese. Hu Songshan helped spread anti-Japanese propaganda among Muslims during the war. Unlike his teacher Ma Wanfu, a strict Wahhabi scripturalist who led the Yihewani with an anti modernist and anti Chinese culture and language ideology, Hu Songshan encouraged Muslims to study Chinese language and learn about modern sciences and education in Chinese.

Imams such as Hu Songshan led the Chinese Muslim Brotherhood (the Yihewani) to incorporate Chinese nationalism and emphasize education and independence.

The Ma clique Muslim generals Ma Fuxiang and Ma Bufang gave support to Hu Songshan.

Hu added subjects such as Chinese language and other modern subjects such as foreign sciences, mathematics and foreign languages to the Islamic curriculum and he translated Islamic texts into Chinese. Hu was close to the Kuomintang Muslim General and governor of Ningxia, Ma Hongkui, and cooperated with him. All imams in Ningxia were required to preach Chinese nationalism during prayer at the mosque during the war with Japan. Hu was active in promoting this curriculum at Sino-Arabic schools in Ningxia. Hu often reminded the Muslim masses that "If we object to natural science, then clothing, food, and shelter could not be talked about.", whenever someone challenged his introduction of modern subjects such as mathematics and science to the Islamic curriculum.

Hu also cited a Hadith(), a saying of the prophet Muhammad, which says "Loving the Motherland is equivalent to loving the Faith". Hu Songshan harshly criticized those who were non patriotic and those who taught anti nationalist thinking, saying that they were fake Muslims.

Anti-Japanese prayer written by Hu

Traditional

祈禱詞的內容如下：真主啊！求您援助我們的政府，使我們的國家永存，使我們的抗戰勝利，消滅我們的敵人。求您保佑我們免遭敵人侵略和殘殺的暴行。求您差遣狂風，使他們的飛機墜落，軍艦葬身大海，士兵厭戰，使他們的經濟崩潰，求您降天災懲罰他們！真主啊！求您賞准我們的祈禱！就這樣吧！

Simplified

祈祷词的内容如下：真主啊！求您援助我们的政府，使我们的国家永存，使我们的抗战胜利，消灭我们的敌人。求您保佑我们免遭敌人侵略和残杀的暴行。求您差遣狂风，使他们的飞机坠落，军舰葬身大海，士兵厌战，使他们的经济崩溃，求您降天灾惩罚他们！真主啊！求您赏准我们的祈祷！就这样吧！

Pinyin

qídǎo cí de nèiróng rúxià ： Zhēnzhǔ ā！qiú nín yuánzhù wǒmen de zhèngfǔ , shǐ wǒmen de guójiā yǒngcún，shǐ wǒmen de kàngzhàn shènglì，xiāomiè wǒmen de dírén。qiú nín bǎoyòu wǒmen miǎnzāo dírén qīnlüè hé cánshā de bàoxíng。qiú nín chāiqiǎn kuángfēng，shǐ tāmen de fēijī zhuìluò，jūnjiàn zàng shēn dàhǎi，shìbīng yàn zhàn，shǐ tāmen de jīngjì bēngkuì，qiú nín jiàng tiānzāi chéngfá tāmen！Zhēnzhǔ ā！qiú nín shǎng zhǔn wǒmen de qídǎo！Jiù zhèyàng ba！

Arabic

Prayer reads as follows: Oh God! Help our government and nation, defeat the invaders, and exterminate our enemies. Protect us from the evil deeds done by the violent Japanese. They have occupied our cities and killed our people. Send upon them a furious wind, cause their airplanes to fall in the wilderness, and their battleships to sink in the sea! Cause their army to scatter, their economy to collapse! Give them their just reward! True God, answer our prayer! So be it/amen.
English translation by Jonathan N. Lipman from page 200 of Familiar Strangers: A History of Muslims in Northwest China

Family 
Hu Songshan's son was Akhund Hu Xueliang (1918 – 1960), the subject of a violent sectarian disturbance over a jurisprudent matter. Hu Xueliang had a son, Hu Xibo.

Shaykh Sa'd al-Din Hu Songshan's grandson is Professor Shaykh Ibrahim Hu Long.

References

External links 
虎嵩山会晤白崇禧
著名经学家虎嵩山阿訇的爱国情
虎嵩山 中国伊斯兰教著名经学家
虎嵩山大阿訇介绍
回族巨擘 当前照片 虎嵩山
首页 > 宗教图库 > 宗教珍宝 虎嵩山

1880 births
1955 deaths
People from Wuzhong
Hui people
Islamic philosophers
Muslim reformers
20th-century Muslim scholars of Islam
Chinese nationalists
Religious leaders in China
Chinese imams